Liam Boyce (born 8 April 1991) is a Northern Irish professional footballer who plays as a forward for Scottish Premiership club Heart of Midlothian and the Northern Ireland national team.

Boyce began his career at Cliftonville and returned to the club following a short spell at Werder Bremen II. He has since played for Ross County, Burton Albion and joined Heart of Midlothian in January 2020. Boyce has also represented the Northern Ireland national football team.

Club career

Cliftonville
Boyce began his career at Cliftonville, scoring 19 goals in his debut season. He won the IFA Premiership Player of the Month Award for April 2010, and was named the Northern Ireland Football Writers' Player of the Year for the 2009–10 season. Boyce is from the Lower Falls in Belfast. He played for Immaculata for most of his youth years, during this time he attended St Joseph's Primary School Slate Street and St Mary's Grammar School, located on the Glen Road in Belfast, he spent all his secondary school years there and went on to study A Levels.

As his ability and skills in his football career developed he was spotted by Cliftonville, and they signed him. He spent his first year there playing in the reserves but in the 2009–10 season, Boyce became a first team regular.

Boyce went on trial with Scottish club Celtic in July 2010, and then held discussions in mid-August 2010 about a move to German club SpVgg Greuther Fürth. However, the move collapsed a few days later.

Boyce scored his first European goal against PFC CSKA Sofia in the 2010–11 UEFA Europa League

Werder Bremen
Boyce eventually signed for another German club, Werder Bremen, on 31 August 2010. He was released by the German club in October 2011, having only made three appearances for the club's reserves side.

Return to Cliftonville
Boyce rejoined Cliftonville in January 2012. In the 2012–13 season, he helped Cliftonville win the league title for the first time since 1998, finishing as the league's top scorer with 29 league goals. He was also named as the 2012–13 Ulster Footballer of the Year and Northern Ireland Football Writers' Player of the Year. He won a second league title with the north Belfast club in 2013–14, scoring another 21 league goals before, in July 2014, the club announced that it had withdrawn its offer of a new contract to Boyce.
During this spell at the Reds Boyce made eight appearances in European football scoring once against Kalmar FF in the qualifiers of the 2012–13 UEFA Europa League .

Ross County
On 13 June 2014, it was announced Boyce had signed a pre-contract with Ross County. On 13 April 2015, Boyce scored County's first ever top-flight hat-trick in a 3–0 win at St Mirren. He then enjoyed a prolific season in 2015–16, scoring 17 goals in 24 games. Boyce signed a new contract with County in February 2016. He was the top goalscorer in the 2016–17 Scottish Premiership, with 23 goals.

Burton Albion
On 20 June 2017, Boyce became a club record signing for EFL Championship side Burton Albion, agreeing a three-year contract with the club. Just weeks later, in a pre-season friendly match against Shrewsbury Town, Boyce suffered a serious knee injury that would keep him out of action for most of the 2017–18 season. He returned to action on 3 February 2018, scoring as Burton lost 3–2 to Aston Villa. On 21 April, Boyce scored an injury-time winner that relegated Sunderland.

Heart of Midlothian
Boyce signed for Heart of Midlothian in January 2020 on a three-and-a-half year deal. He scored the winning goal in the 83rd minute of his debut against Rangers.

International career
On 31 January 2011, Boyce received his debut call-up in the Northern Ireland national team to appear for the Nations Cup. This call-up came after his move to German club Werder Bremen in September 2010. On 9 February 2011, Boyce made his debut against Scotland in which he came on as a 72nd-minute substitute for Niall McGinn. He received his second call-up for Northern Ireland's Group C clash with Serbia in Belgrade on 25 March 2011.

On 2 June 2017, Boyce scored his first goal for Northern Ireland in a 1–0 friendly victory over New Zealand at Windsor Park.

Career statistics

Club

International

Scores and results list Northern Ireland's goal tally first.

Honours
Cliftonville
Irish Premiership: 2012–13, 2013–14
 Irish League Cup: 2012–13, 2013–14
 County Antrim Shield: 2008–09, 2011–12

Ross County
Scottish League Cup: 2015–16

Hearts
 Scottish Championship: 2020–21
 Scottish Cup runner-up: 2019–20, 2021–22

Individual
Scottish Premiership Top Scorer: 2016–17
Scottish Championship Top Scorer: 2020–21
  
PFA Scotland Players' Player of the Year: 2020–21 Scottish Championship

References

External links

Profile at Irish FA

1991 births
Living people
Association football forwards
Association footballers from Northern Ireland
Northern Ireland youth international footballers
Northern Ireland under-21 international footballers
Northern Ireland international footballers
Cliftonville F.C. players
SV Werder Bremen II players
Ross County F.C. players
Burton Albion F.C. players
Heart of Midlothian F.C. players
Expatriate footballers in Germany
Ulster Footballers of the Year
Northern Ireland Football Writers' Association Players of the Year
Scottish league football top scorers
NIFL Premiership players
3. Liga players
Scottish Professional Football League players
English Football League players